Vitex tripinnata is a species of tropical forest tree in the family Lamiaceae.  Its recorded distribution is: Cambodia, Hainan island, Laos, Thailand and Vietnam: where it may be called Mắt cáo or Bình linh Evard.

References

External links

tripinnata
Flora of Indo-China
Trees of Vietnam
Taxa named by João de Loureiro